The  is the civil aviation authority of Japan and a division of the Ministry of Land, Infrastructure, Transport and Tourism (MLIT). Its head office is in the MLIT building in Kasumigaseki, Chiyoda, Tokyo. It is the Japanese equivalent of the U.S. Federal Aviation Administration.

Aircraft

The JCAB operates or has operated the following aircraft:

Jet

 Bombardier Global Express
 Cessna Citation CJ4 (525C model) - five in service for calibration duties as of June 2022.
 Cessna Citation Longitude - one, equipped for calibration of ground-based navigation and landing systems, received in June 2022, to replace the Dash 8.
 Gulfstream IV

Turboprop

 de Havilland Canada DHC-8-300 Dash 8
 NAMC YS-11
 Saab 2000

Helicopter

 Bell 412EP

See also

 Japan Transport Safety Board (current accident investigation agency)
 Aircraft and Railway Accidents Investigation Commission (predecessor air and rail accident investigation agency)
 Aircraft Accident Investigation Commission (predecessor air accident investigation agency)

References

External links
 Civil Aviation Bureau
 Civil Aviation Bureau 
 Flight Information Region In Japan
 "Working Arrangement between The Civil Aviation Bureau, Ministry of Land, Infrastructure and Transport, Japan (CAB) and The European Aviation Safety Agency (EASA)." (Archive)

Japan
Government agencies of Japan
Civil aviation in Japan
Transport organizations based in Japan